Hermadionella truncata is a scale worm known from the north-west Pacific and Arctic Oceans at depths down to about 200 m.

Description
Hermadionella truncata has up to about 60 segments with 15 pairs of elytra. The lateral antennae are positioned ventrally on the prostomium, directly beneath the median antenna. Notochaetae are distinctly thicker than the  neurochaetae, and the neurochaetae bear bidentate tips.

References

Phyllodocida